The Riegelsville Bridge is a suspension bridge crossing the Delaware River at Riegelsville, Pennsylvania, connecting it with Riegelsville, New Jersey, United States.

History
Traffic across the Delaware River at Riegelsville, Pennsylvania, was handled by Wendel and Anthony Shenk's oar powered ferries until December 15, 1837, when a three-span, wooden covered bridge was opened to horse, wagon, and pedestrian use. The Pennsylvania and New Jersey legislatures had approved the formation of the private Riegelsville Delaware Bridge Corporation in 1835 and the company engaged Solon Chapin and James Madison Porter of Easton, Pennsylvania as the contractors. A major flood struck the Delaware Valley on January 8, 1841, just three years after the bridge opened, and the span nearest the Jersey shore was destroyed. The bridge was repaired and survived another flood in June 1862.

The two spans nearest to New Jersey were quickly swept down the river. The third section collapsed soon after.

The wire rope and engineering firm of John A. Roebling's Sons Co., based in Trenton, New Jersey, were soon commissioned and replaced the covered bridge with a cable suspension bridge. This new bridge incorporated the original piers which were repaired and raised several feet, allowing it to survive major damage from the flood of 1936 and to come through a 1955 deluge relatively unscathed. It opened on April 18, 1904.

Roebling's original design for the bridge employed main cables  in diameter. Professor James Madison Porter III, the grandson of the builder of the earlier Riegelsville bridge, was asked to evaluate the new design and felt the need for additional cables of  diameter, which were added to the plans.

The Riegelsville suspension bridge collected tolls until it was purchased by the Joint Commission for Eliminating Tolls and is currently maintained by the Delaware River Joint Toll Bridge Commission using revenues generated from larger, more heavily trafficked crossings. The bridge has a 3-ton weight limit. It was added to the New Jersey Register of Historic Places on March 22, 2010.

See also
List of bridges documented by the Historic American Engineering Record in New Jersey
List of bridges documented by the Historic American Engineering Record in Pennsylvania
List of crossings of the Delaware River

References

External links

Delaware River Joint Toll Bridge Commission
1904 establishments in New Jersey
1904 establishments in Pennsylvania
Road bridges in New Jersey
Road bridges in Pennsylvania
Bridges over the Delaware River
Suspension bridges in New Jersey
Suspension bridges in Pennsylvania
Bridges completed in 1904
Bridges in Bucks County, Pennsylvania
Pohatcong Township, New Jersey
Historic American Engineering Record in New Jersey
Historic American Engineering Record in Pennsylvania
Former toll bridges in New Jersey
Former toll bridges in Pennsylvania
Bridges in Warren County, New Jersey
Interstate vehicle bridges in the United States
New Jersey Register of Historic Places